Artificial Sun is a Russian record label. The label was launched in 2012 to distribute records by industrial bands and artists mainly on territory of Russia, CIS and Europe and Naveen.

Artists
Artists currently signed to Artificial Sun include Type V Blood, Hydra Division V, KaaK, and Absenth.

The label also distributed compilations featuring artists like Die Krupps, C-Lekktor, Lord Of The Lost, Albert Pak, Otto Dix, and Cryo.

Discography

Albums 
Penta (Type V Blood, 2012)

Compilations and tributes 
The Voices Of Machine (Various, 2012)
Russian Industrial Tribute To Die Krupps (Various, 2013)
Elektrozorn Vol. 1 (Various, 2013)

References

External links 
Official website

Russian record labels
Russian brands
Record labels established in 2012
Industrial record labels
Companies based in Samara Oblast